The 2001 King of the Ring was the ninth annual King of the Ring professional wrestling pay-per-view (PPV) event produced by the World Wrestling Federation (WWF, now WWE) that featured the 15th King of the Ring tournament. It was the final King of the Ring PPV and tournament held under the WWF name as the promotion was renamed to World Wrestling Entertainment (WWE) in May 2002. The event took place on June 24, 2001, at the Continental Airlines Arena in East Rutherford, New Jersey. The main event was a Triple threat match, a match involving three competitors, for the WWF Championship. Stone Cold Steve Austin defeated Chris Benoit and Chris Jericho to retain the title. The undercard featured the 2001 King of the Ring tournament, which was won by Edge.

There were other matches on the undercard, including a Street Fight between Kurt Angle and Shane McMahon, a WWF Light Heavyweight Championship match between champion Jeff Hardy and challenger X-Pac and a WWF Tag Team Championship between champions Dudley Boyz (Bubba Ray Dudley and D-Von Dudley) and the challenger team of Kane and Spike Dudley. The show is also notable for featuring the WWF debut of Booker T.

Production

Background
King of the Ring was a pay-per-view (PPV) event held annually in June by the World Wrestling Federation (WWF, now WWE) since 1993. The PPV featured the King of the Ring tournament, a single-elimination tournament that was established in 1985 and held annually until 1991, with the exception of 1990; these early tournaments were held as special non-televised house shows. The winner of the tournament was crowned "King of the Ring." Unlike the non-televised events, the PPV did not feature all of the tournament's matches. Instead, several of the qualifying matches preceded the event with the final few matches then taking place at the pay-per-view. There were also other matches that took place at the event as it was a traditional three-hour pay-per-view. Considered as one of the WWF's "Big Five" PPVs, along with the Royal Rumble, WrestleMania, SummerSlam, and Survivor Series, the company's five biggest shows of the year, the 2001 event was the ninth King of the Ring PPV and 15th tournament overall. It was held on June 24, 2001 at the Continental Airlines Arena in East Rutherford, New Jersey.

Storylines
King of the Ring featured professional wrestling matches that involved different wrestlers from pre-existing feuds, plots, and storylines that were played out on Raw is War and SmackDown!—World Wrestling Federation's (WWF) television programs. Wrestlers portrayed a villain or a hero as they followed a series of events that built tension, and culminated in a wrestling match or series of matches.

The pay-per-view event featured the annual King of the Ring single elimination bracket tournament. The qualification for the tournament started on the June 4, 2001 episode of Raw is War, with Jeff Hardy and Rhyno defeating Matt Hardy and Tazz respectively. The qualification continued on the June 7 episode of SmackDown!, as Kurt Angle defeated Hardcore Holly and Edge defeated Test. On the June 11 episode of Raw is War, Christian and Perry Saturn defeated Kane and Steve Blackman in respective matches to qualify for the tournament. On the June 14 episode of SmackDown!, qualification ended as Big Show defeated Raven and Tajiri defeated Crash Holly. On the June 18 episode of Raw is War, the quarterfinal round occurred as Kurt Angle defeated Jeff Hardy, Rhyno defeated Tajiri, Edge defeated Perry Saturn and Christian defeated Big Show.

The main rivalry heading into the event was between Steve Austin, Chris Benoit and Chris Jericho for the WWF Championship. At Judgment Day, Benoit and Jericho won a Tag Team Turmoil match to become the #1 contenders for the WWF Tag Team Championship. The next night, on the May 21, 2001 episode of Raw is War, Benoit and Jericho defeated The Two-Man Power Trip (Steve Austin and Triple H) for the Tag Team Championship. Triple H suffered a legitimate quadriceps injury and was out of action for nearly a year. Austin started to feud with Benoit and Jericho. Austin defeated Benoit and Jericho in separate title matches. On the June 11 episode of Raw is War, it was announced that Austin would defend the title against Benoit and Jericho in a Triple Threat match at King of the Ring.

Another preliminary feud heading into the event was between Kurt Angle and Shane McMahon. On the May 21 episode of Raw is War, McMahon interrupted Angle's celebration of regaining his Olympic gold medals from Chris Benoit, the previous night at Judgment Day. McMahon announced that WCW was coming back and mocked Angle, which led to Angle executing an Angle Slam on McMahon. On the June 11 episode of Raw is War, McMahon attacked Angle with an Angle Slam after Angle was attacked by The Undertaker. This led to a match between Angle and McMahon at King of the Ring.

On the June 11 episode of Raw is War, Hardy Boyz (Matt Hardy and Jeff Hardy) defeated X-Factor (X-Pac and Justin Credible) in a tag team match when Jeff pinned X-Pac. After the match, X-Pac hit Jeff with a steel chair. This led to a match between Jeff and X-Pac for Jeff's WWF Light Heavyweight Championship match at King of the Ring.

Spike Dudley, a member of the Dudley Boyz with Bubba Ray Dudley and D-Von Dudley, split from the group when Bubba and D-Von started to turn into villains. Spike started a storyline affair with Molly Holly of Holly Cousins (Hardcore Holly and Crash Holly), rivals of the Dudley Boyz. On the May 21 episode of Raw is War, Bubba and D-Von powerbombed Molly on a table but Spike laid down on the table to protect Molly. On the June 21 episode of SmackDown!, Dudley Boyz defeated Chris Benoit and Chris Jericho for the WWF Tag Team Championship, leading to a title defense for Dudley Boyz against Spike and a partner of Spike's choosing at King of the Ring.

Another major storyline in the WWF heading into the event was that a mystery man was stalking The Undertaker's wife, Sara. On the June 11 episode of Raw is War, Undertaker confronted Kurt Angle as he thought that Angle was Sara's stalker. Angle refused to claim that he was the stalker and insulted Sara, prompting Undertaker to hit Angle with a Last Ride. On the June 18 episode of Raw is War, Diamond Dallas Page debuted in WWF and revealed that he was Sara's stalker.

Event

Before the event aired live on pay-per-view, Matt Hardy defended the WWF European Championship against Justin Credible in a match that aired live on Sunday Night Heat. Hardy's valet Lita hit Credible with a Diving Hurricanrana. Hardy pinned Credible to retain the European Championship.

Preliminary matches
As the show began, the semi-final round of the King of the Ring tournament started with Kurt Angle wrestling against his teammate Christian. Angle dominated the match earlier on and tried to finish it quickly but Christian started getting momentum over Angle. Angle quickly regained momentum by hitting Christian with a series of suplexes. Christian eventually hit Angle with a Spinning Heel Kick. Christian started dominating the match until Shane McMahon interfered in the match and prevented Christian from winning the match. Angle took advantage and hit Christian with an Olympic Slam for the victory.

The next match in the semi-final was between Edge and Rhyno. Rhyno dominated most of the match and untied a turnbuckle pad. Both men eventually knocked out each other by Spearing and hitting a Gore on each other. Rhyno tried to hit another Gore on Edge but Edge avoided the move and Rhyno hit the untied turnbuckle. Edge followed by hitting Rhyno with an Edgecution to advance to the final round.

The third match was Dudley Boyz's (Bubba Ray Dudley and D-Von Dudley) scheduled title defense of the WWF Tag Team Championship against Spike Dudley and a mystery partner. The mystery partner was revealed to be the current Intercontinental champion Kane. Spike battled the Dudley Boyz for most of the match until Kane was tagged in. Kane dominated the Dudley Boyz until Spike was tagged in again. Spike hit Bubba with a Dudley Dog and tried to pin Bubba for the victory. However, D-Von prevented Spike from pinning Bubba and the Dudley Boyz hit Spike with a 3-D to retain the Tag Team Championship.

The fourth match was the final round of the King of the Ring tournament between Kurt Angle and Edge. Angle focused on Edge's ribs that were injured during his match with Rhyno. Angle dominated most of the match against Edge before applying an Ankle Lock on Edge. Edge reversed the hold into a pinfall but Christian distracted the referee to prevent Edge from winning the match. Angle applied another Ankle Lock on Edge and Edge tapped out to the hold but was unable to win the match as the referee was still distracted. Shane McMahon interfered in the match by spearing Angle. Edge followed it by hitting Angle with an Edgecution to win the 2001 King of the Ring tournament.

The fifth match pitted Jeff Hardy defending the WWF Light Heavyweight Championship against X-Pac. Hardy dominated earlier part of the match until X-Pac got control of the match. Throughout the match, Hardy and X-Pac did cruiserweight action. In the closing moments of the match, X-Pac hit Hardy with an X-Factor and pinned him. However, as the match ended, the referee realized that Hardy's foot was on the rope and the match continued. Hardy executed a Swanton Bomb and got the pinfall to retain the Light Heavyweight Championship.

Main event matches
Before the Street Fight between Kurt Angle and Shane McMahon occurred, Diamond Dallas Page invited The Undertaker to the ring as videos of DDP's personal life were being aired by Undertaker's wife Sara throughout the event. Undertaker and DDP had a confrontation which quickly turned into a brawl. Undertaker began dominating the brawl until DDP escaped the arena through the crowd, while Sara videotaped him leaving.

After that, the Street Fight match between Angle and McMahon began. The match went back and forth as Angle dominated earlier part of the match until McMahon got control of the match. The action spilled outside the ring with both men using weapons and items of the arena on each other. A notable part of the match occurred when Angle failed to suplex McMahon through a plate glass window, which was a part of the set. It took multiple attempts to break the glass, with each failure resulting in McMahon landing on his head and neck. Angle performed an Angle Slam on McMahon from the top rope to win the match.

The main event was a Triple Threat match for the WWF Championship. Stone Cold Steve Austin defended the title against Chris Jericho and Chris Benoit. Benoit and Jericho chased Austin outside the ring and forced him to return to the ring. Austin started attacking Benoit until Benoit and Jericho double-teamed Austin. After Austin was attacked, Benoit and Jericho battled each other. Jericho trapped Austin in the Walls of Jericho until Benoit suplexed Jericho outside the ring. Benoit then locked in the Crossface on Austin. The action continued as all the three men continued to attack each other. At one point in the match, both Jericho and Benoit forced Austin to submit to the Walls of Jericho and Crippler Crossface at the same time. However, since there could be only one winner, the match continued. The WCW Champion Booker T made his WWF debut and attacked Austin with a Scissors Kick and a Sidewalk Slam through an announce table. Benoit would follow by executing  a back-suplex off the top-rope on Jericho, which legitimately broke Benoit's neck. Austin would crawl over to Benoit and pin him to retain the WWF Championship.

Aftermath

Chris Benoit suffered a career-halting neck injury after his Triple Threat match at King of the Ring and was out of action for one year. Shane McMahon and WCW wrestlers started involving themselves in the WWF, which led to the beginning of The Invasion storyline. The storyline had WWF wrestlers battle against invaders from WCW and ECW.

The King of the Ring tournament caused Team RECK (Rhyno, Edge, Christian and Kurt Angle) to split due to battling each other in the semifinals of the tournament. Angle began representing WWF against The Alliance whereas Rhyno joined Alliance. Edge and Christian continued teaming up until the team split when Christian turned on Edge after being jealous of Edge's success. Edge and Christian would feud with each other over the WWF Intercontinental Championship.

The 2001 King of the Ring would be the final King of the Ring tournament and PPV held under the WWF name as the promotion was renamed to World Wrestling Entertainment (WWE) in May 2002. It was also the final tournament and PPV held before the promotion introduced the brand extension in March 2002, in which the roster was divided between the Raw and SmackDown! brands where wrestlers were exclusively assigned to perform.

Results

Tournament brackets
The tournament took place between June 4 and June 24, 2001. The tournament brackets were as follows:

References

External links
 King of the Ring 2001 at Online World of Wrestling
 WWF King of the Ring 2001 at Complete WWE

2001
2001 in New Jersey
Events in East Rutherford, New Jersey
Professional wrestling in East Rutherford, New Jersey
2001 WWF pay-per-view events
June 2001 events in the United States